Méira Cook (born May 14, 1964) is a novelist and poet born in Johannesburg, South Africa, and now residing in Winnipeg, Canada.

Academic career 

Méira Cook received her MA from University of the Witwatersrand, South Africa, in 1988; her thesis was a Lacanian reading of short stories by Isaac Bashevis Singer, She worked as a journalist before she moved to Canada in 1991, where she enrolled at the University of Manitoba and received her PhD in Canadian Literature. Cook taught creative writing classes at the University of Manitoba, was an editor for Prairie Fire, and was the Carol Shields writer in residence at the University of Winnipeg in 2018.

Poetry and fiction
In 2007 her poetry won first prize in the CBC Literary awards and then in 2008 her work was published in The Best Canadian Poetry in 2008. In 2012 her poem "The Devil's Advocate" won the inaugural Walrus Poetry Prize. In 2013 her first novel, The House on Sugarbush Road, won the McNally Robinson Book of the Year Award. Cook's Nightwatching, won the Margaret Laurence Award for Fiction.

Works 
Text Into Flesh: A Lacanian Reading Of Selected Short Stories By I.B. Singer, 1992
Fine Grammar of Bones, 1993
Toward a Catalogue of Falling, 1996
 The Blood Girls, 1998
Slovenly Love, 2003
Writing Lovers: Reading Canadian Love Poetry by Women, 2005
Field Marks: Poetry of Don Mckay, 2006
A Walker in the City, 2011
House on Sugarbush Road, 2012
Monologue Dogs, 2015
 Nightwatching, 2015
 Once More with Feeling, 2017
 The Full Catastrophe, 2022'''

Awards 
First Place Prize CBC Literary Awards in 2007
McNally Robinson Book of the Year Award in 2013
Inaugural Walrus Poetry Prize 2012
Margaret Laurence Award For Fiction

References 

1964 births
Living people
People from Johannesburg
University of Manitoba alumni
Writers from Winnipeg
University of the Witwatersrand alumni
Academic staff of the University of Manitoba